Reilly Opelka was the defending champion but lost in the first round to Tennys Sandgren.

Tim Smyczek won the title after defeating Tennys Sandgren 6–7(5–7), 6–3, 6–2 in the final.

Seeds

Draw

Finals

Top half

Bottom half

References
Main Draw
Qualifying Draw

Charlottesville Men's Pro Challenger - Singles
2017 Singles